Love and Rage may refer to:

 Love and Rage (1998 film), British-Irish-German film 
 Love and Rage (2009 film), Danish film
 Love & Rage (organization), American anarchist federation
 Love & Rage, 2021 music album released by American singer-songwriter Carsie Blanton